The 26th national football championship in Vietnam known locally as the Vietnam National A1 Football Cup was played from December 1982 until May 1982

17 teams again took part in the competition that was played in three stages; a Group stage featuring 2 groups of 9 and 8 teams of which the top four qualified for stage two. The group winners of stage 2 would meet in the final.

The bottom two placed teams from the first stage would meet in an end of season relegation match.

First stage

Group A

Group B

Second stage

Group A

Group B

Relegation playoff

Final

Vietnamese Super League seasons
1983 in Vietnamese football
1982 in Vietnamese football
Viet